Derek Leung Wai Fung (born 22 December 2000) is a Hong Kong professional footballer who currently plays as a centre back for Hong Kong Premier League club HK U23.

Career statistics

Club

Notes

References

External links
 

Living people
2000 births
Hong Kong footballers
Association football defenders
Hong Kong Premier League players
Hong Kong First Division League players
Yuen Long FC players
HK U23 Football Team players